Cape Maundy Thursday is an ice-capped headland in Qikiqtaaluk Region, Nunavut, Canada.

References
 Atlas of Canada

Peninsulas of Qikiqtaaluk Region
Sverdrup Islands